Short Trip Home is an album of classical chamber music by a quartet unusual both for its membership and its instrumentation.  Double bassist Edgar Meyer wrote the majority of the compositions recorded on the album for a quartet of violin, double bass, mandolin, and guitar.  Classical violinist Joshua Bell joins bluegrass musicians Sam Bush and Mike Marshall and Meyer on the album.  In addition to classical music in an American vernacular, the quartet occasionally breaks out on more traditional instrumental bluegrass tunes.

Track listing
"Short Trip Home" (Edgar Meyer)
"Hang Hang" (Meyer, Mike Marshall)
"BT" (Meyer)
"In the Nick of Time" (Meyer)
Concert Duo. Prequel (Meyer)
"BP" (Meyer)
"If I Knew" (Meyer)
"OK, All Right" (Meyer)
"Death by Triple Fiddle" (Meyer, Sam Bush, Marshall, Joshua Bell)
Concert Duo. 1 (all movements by Meyer)
Concert Duo. 2
Concert Duo. 3 
Concert Duo. 4

Personnel
Joshua Bell, violin
Edgar Meyer, bass
Sam Bush, mandolin; violin on "Death by Triple Fiddle"
Mike Marshall, guitar; mandola on "BT"; violin on "Death by Triple Fiddle"

In popular culture
The track "Short Trip Home" is heard in the Richard Proenneke documentary Alone in the Wilderness.

The tracks “In the Nick of Time” and "Concert Duo. 1" are heard in the Ken Burns documentary The War (miniseries).

The track "BT" was used as the theme song for WUNC (FM)'s The State of Things (radio show) from 2004 until 2010.

References

1999 albums
Classical crossover albums